Sympathetic may refer to:

 Sympathy, in psychology, a feeling of compassion or identification with another
 Sympathetic detonation, a detonation, usually unintended, of an explosive charge by a nearby explosion
 Sympathetic magic, in religion, magic, and anthropology, the belief that like affects like, that something can be influenced through its relationship with another thing
 Sympathetic nervous system, in neurology and neuroscience, a part of the autonomic nervous system
 Sympathetic resonance, a harmonic phenomenon wherein a body responds to external vibrations
 Sympathetic strings, in music theory, strings on a musical instrument that resonate without contact
 "Sympathetic", a song by Seether from Disclaimer II